Hillman Township is the name of two places in the U.S. state of Minnesota:
Hillman Township, Kanabec County, Minnesota
Hillman Township, Morrison County, Minnesota

See also
Hillman Township (disambiguation)

Minnesota township disambiguation pages